Coragus (Κόραγος) of the Macedonian army was a celebrated warrior and companion of Alexander the Great.  He is best known for his defeat at the hands of the Athenian Dioxippus, practitioner of pankration.

During a banquet thrown by the Macedonian emperor, Coragus challenged Dioxippus to single combat, which he accepted.  Coragus attended the duel in full body armor and weaponry, including javelins, a spear, and a sword, while Dioxippus appeared with a simple club.  After having his javelin dodged and his spear shattered by Dioxippus, Coragus approached the warrior to engage him with his sword, but before he could draw his blade Dioxippus utilized his pankration techniques to topple the Macedonian warrior.  With Dioxippus' foot on his neck, Coragus was spared and released, and Dioxippus was declared the winner of the duel, much to the chagrin of the Macedonians (and the joy of the Athenians in attendance.)

Whether Coragus was involved in the later conspiracy that led to Dioxippus' suicide is unknown.

References

4th-century BC Macedonians
Pankratiasts